Arnold Gay (born 11 May 1967) is a radio presenter and former television presenter from Singapore. He is currently presenting the breakfast show on CNA938 together with Yasmin Jonkers from June 2019. He previously worked at Singapore radio stations Class 95FM, Power 98 FM and Kiss 92FM, and was a broadcast journalist at various TV stations including Channel NewsAsia, CNBC Asia, Bloomberg TV and Reuters TV.

Biography 
Gay's first job in radio was as a presenter at Class 95FM, where he subsequently became the station's Music Director. He then became the Music Director at the newly-opened Power 98 FM in 1994.

Gay then moved into the television industry in 1995, becoming a Music Video Programmer for Channel V in Hong Kong. In 1998, he returned to Singapore to become a news reporter at Channel NewsAsia. In 2001, he moved to the new Singapore Press Holdings television channel, TV Works, as a presenter on the Straits Times TV News (later renamed Channel i News). When the channel folded at the end of 2004, he became an Assistant News Editor for the Straits Times newspaper. In 2005, he became the Singapore Press Holdings Head of Corporate Relations. He later moved back into broadcast journalism and had stints at CNBC Asia, Bloomberg TV and Reuters TV.

In 2012, Gay returned to the radio industry to join the new Singapore radio station Kiss 92FM. Since the station opened in August 2012, he has been the co-host of the station's breakfast show, 'Maddy, Jason and Arnold in the Mornings', from 6.00 – 10.00 am on weekdays together with Maddy Barber and Jason Johnson until March 2019. He left the station to host the breakfast show, "Asia First", with former Money FM 89.3 DJ Yasmin Jonkers, on a revamped radio station, CNA938 (previously 938Now).

Education 
Gay was educated at Catholic High School, St Joseph's Institution and Raffles Junior College, before going on to the National University of Singapore where he majored in Economics and Psychology.

Personal life 
Gay has two brothers and one sister. His father was a Station Manager for British Airways and his mother was a bank officer.

Gay met his wife, Deborah Chia, when she was working as a DJ at Class 95FM. The couple have one son.

References

1967 births
Living people
Singaporean radio presenters
Singaporean television presenters
Raffles Junior College alumni